R-8 regional road (previously known as R-23 regional road) is a Montenegrin roadway.

History

In January 2016, the Ministry of Transport and Maritime Affairs published bylaw on categorisation of state roads. With this bylaw R-23 regional road was renamed as R-8 regional road.

Major intersections

References

R-8